Perla gas field is a giant offshore gas field in the Gulf of Venezuela.

The field was discovered in 1976. Exploration activities were carried out in 2009.

At the phase I light offshore platforms will be installed to utilise the wells already drilled.  A pipeline will be installed to a central processing facility located onshore. The phase I is expected to cost of US$1.4 billion.

The field will be developed by consortium of Repsol YPF (50%) and Eni (50%) .  The front-end loading will be carried out by Foster Wheeler.  The field is expected to come onstream by the first half of 2013.   The development contract will be in force until 2036.

References

Natural gas fields in Venezuela